The future annual FIFA club competition is a planned annual international men's association football competition organised by the Fédération Internationale de Football Association (FIFA), the sport's global governing body. The first edition is scheduled to take place in 2024. The competition will feature the club champions of the six confederations of FIFA, and will be played as a knockout tournament with the European team receiving a bye to the final.

Background
On 16 December 2022, the FIFA Council approved the expansion of the FIFA Club World Cup from seven to thirty-two teams beginning in 2025. The 2023 tournament will therefore be the last played under the previous format. However, confederations expressed to FIFA the need for the champions of their top club competitions to still play each other annually to "stimulate competitiveness". Therefore, on 14 March 2023, the FIFA Council approved a strategic concept for an annual club competition beginning in 2024. It will feature the champions of the top club competitions of the six confederations of FIFA, namely the AFC Champions League, Africa Super League, CONCACAF Champions League, Copa Libertadores, OFC Champions League and UEFA Champions League. The competition will feature a series of intercontinental play-offs between clubs from all confederations except UEFA, whose club will receive a bye to the final. The final between the winners of the play-offs and UEFA Champions League will take place at a neutral venue, with the winning club crowned champions of the competition.

References

FIFA club competitions
Recurring sporting events established in 2023